Go Soeda declared as champion after defeating Matthias Bachinger with score 6–4, 7–5 in the final.

Seeds

Draw

Finals

Top half

Bottom half

References
Main Draw
Qualifying Singles

Green World ATP Challenger - Singles
2011 Singles
2011 in Chinese tennis